The SEAT 127 is a supermini produced by the Spanish automaker SEAT between the spring of 1972 and 1982, based on the Fiat 127.

Due to SEAT design policy, a four-door variant of the car (without a hatchback lid, in spite of the fastback roofline) was added to the lineup in 1973. While usually fitted with the same 903 cc engine as in the Fiat 127, SEAT also produced a unique variant of the 127 OHV engine.

The SEAT 127 underwent the same styling modifications as did the Fiat 127 (new grille, taillights, bumpers) for the Serie 2, of January 1980. At the same time, a full five-door hatchback bodywork also became available.

When their licence from Fiat expired, SEAT redesigned some parts of the car and renamed it the SEAT Fura. Some design parts of this model were also used in the Ibiza Mk1. SEAT produced 1,238,166 units of the 127 between 1972 and 1982.

References

127
1970s cars
1980s cars
Cars of Spain
Cars introduced in 1972